Järvepää is a lake of Estonia.

See also
List of lakes in Estonia

Jarvepaa
Setomaa Parish
Jarvepaa